Rain and snow mixed is precipitation composed of a mixture of rain and partially melted snow. Unlike ice pellets, which are hard, and freezing rain, which is fluid until striking an object where it fully freezes, this precipitation is soft and translucent, but it contains some traces of ice crystals from partially fused snowflakes, also called slush. In any one location, it usually occurs briefly as a transition phase from rain to snow or vice versa, but hits the surface before fully transforming. Its METAR code is RASN or SNRA.

Terminology 
This precipitation type is commonly known as sleet in most Commonwealth countries. However, the United States National Weather Service uses the term sleet to refer to ice pellets instead. In Ithaca, NY, the term Ithacating is used to describe precipitation made of a mix of rain and snow.

Formation 
Rain and snow typically mix when the melting layer depth falls between these values as rain starts forming when in that range.

"Wintry showers" or "wintry mixes" 
Wintry showers is a somewhat informal meteorological term, used primarily in the United Kingdom, to refer to various mixtures of rain, graupel and snow at once. Though no "official" criteria exist for the term, in the United Kingdom the term is not used when any significant accumulation of snow on the ground takes place.  It is often used when the temperature of the ground surface is above , preventing accumulation from occurring even if the air temperature near the surface is marginally below ; but even then, the falling precipitation must generally have something else other than exclusively snow.

In the United States, wintry mix generally refers to a mixture of freezing rain, ice pellets, and snow. In contrast to the usage in the United Kingdom, in the United States it is usually used when both air and ground temperatures are below . Additionally, it is generally used when some surface accumulation of ice and snow is expected to occur. During winter, a wide area can be affected by the multiple mixed precipitation types typical of a wintry mix during a single winter storm, as counter-clockwise winds around a storm system bring warm air northwards ahead of the system, and then bring cold air back southwards behind it. Most often, it is the region ahead of the approaching storm system which sees the wintry mix, as warm air moves northward and above retreating cold air in a warm front, causing snow to change into ice pellets, freezing rain and finally rain. The reverse transition can occur behind the departing low pressure system, though it is more common for precipitation to freeze directly from rain to snow, or for it to stop before a transition back.

See also 
 Freezing rain
 Ice pellets
 Sleet (disambiguation)
 Slush
 Winter weather

References

External links 
AMS Glossary

Precipitation
Snow or ice weather phenomena

he:גשם-שלג
is:slydda